Live in London, Hammersmith Apollo 1993 is a concert film by the then newly reformed Dio band on the last night of their European tour in support of the Strange Highways album.  The concert was recorded at Hammersmith Apollo in London, England on December 12, 1993.  The film was released on CD, DVD and Blu-ray in 2014 by Eagle Rock Entertainment.

The band's performers included Ronnie James Dio (vocals), Vinny Appice (drums), Jeff Pilson (bass) and Tracy G (guitar). In addition to tracks from the "Strange Highways" album, the concert featured other Dio classic songs and some from Ronnie's career with Black Sabbath and Rainbow.

Track List

Charts

References

2014 albums
Dio (band) video albums
Live video albums
Albums recorded at the Hammersmith Apollo